Sound of Christmas is an album of Christmas music by the Ramsey Lewis Trio, recorded in 1961 and released on the Argo label. The album rose to No. 8 on the Billboard Christmas LPs chart. Lewis recorded a second seasonal album, More Sounds of Christmas, in 1964.

Reception

AllMusic stated: "This is a pleasing, if rather brief (29 minutes) Christmas jazz album that was originally quite popular... fun and melodic, if not all that unique".

Track listing
 "Merry Christmas Baby" (Lou Baxter, Johnny Moore) - 4:04
 "Winter Wonderland" (Felix Bernard, Richard B. Smith) - 2:11
 "Santa Claus Is Coming to Town" (J. Fred Coots, Haven Gillespie) - 2:25
 "Christmas Blues" (Skitch Henderson, Ramsey Lewis) - 2:50
 "Here Comes Santa Claus" (Gene Autry, Oakley Haldeman) - 2:41
 "The Sound of Christmas" (Riley Hampton, Lewis) - 2:22
 "The Christmas Song" (Mel Tormé, Robert Wells) - 3:18
 "God Rest Ye Merry Gentlemen" (Traditional) - 3:19
 "Sleigh Ride" (Leroy Anderson, Mitchell Parish) - 2:58
 "What Are You Doing New Year's Eve?" (Frank Loesser) - 3:27

Personnel 
Ramsey Lewis - piano
El Dee Young - bass
Issac "Red" Holt - drums
String section arranged and conducted by Riley Hampton (tracks 6-10)

References 

 
1961 Christmas albums
Christmas albums by American artists
Ramsey Lewis albums
Argo Records albums
Albums produced by Ralph Bass
Jazz Christmas albums